Timothy Tarquin Hutton (born August 16, 1960) is an American actor and film director. He is the youngest recipient of the Academy Award for Best Supporting Actor, which he won at age 20 for his performance as Conrad Jarrett in Ordinary People (1980). Hutton has since appeared regularly in feature films and on television, with featured roles in the drama Taps (1981), the spy film The Falcon and the Snowman (1985), and the horror film The Dark Half (1993), among others.

Between 2000 and 2002, Hutton starred as Archie Goodwin in the A&E drama series A Nero Wolfe Mystery. Between 2008 and 2012, he starred as Nathan "Nate" Ford on the TNT drama series Leverage. He also had a role in the first season of the Amazon streaming drama series Jack Ryan.

Early life
Timothy Hutton was born in Malibu, California. His father was actor Jim Hutton; his mother, Maryline Adams (née Poole), was a teacher. His parents divorced when Hutton was three years old, and his mother took him and his older sister, Heidi (born in 1959), with her to Boston, and then to her hometown Harwinton, Connecticut. The family returned to California when Hutton was 12.

"A lot of people think that because my father was an actor, I come from this big show-business background," Hutton told Bruce Cook of American Film magazine in 1981. "But that's not how I grew up at all. My mother took us to Cambridge because she wanted to get her M.A. She wound up teaching in Connecticut, but the way she saw it, after a while, if we all stayed there, my sister and I would just wind up as the proprietors of the local drugstore or something, so that was why she took us to Berkeley, California - to get us into the world, I guess. Now she's given up teaching and she's into printing miniature books."

In 1976 when he was 15, Hutton sought out his father and moved in with him in Los Angeles.  At Fairfax High School, while playing Nathan Detroit in a school production of Guys and Dolls, he realized he wanted to become an actor. With encouragement from both of his parents, he began acting in television.

On June 2, 1979, Jim Hutton died in Los Angeles from liver cancer, two days after his 45th birthday. In 1981, Hutton thanked his father during his Academy Award speech, which he had won for his role in the movie Ordinary People.

Acting career
Timothy Hutton's career began with parts in several television movies, most notably the 1979 ABC TV film Friendly Fire. That year, he also played the son of Donna Reed in the Ross Hunter NBC television film The Best Place to Be. He then made two CBS made-for TV films in 1980: Young Love, First Love with Valerie Bertinelli, and Father Figure with Hal Linden. For his first feature film performance, as Conrad Jarrett in Ordinary People (1980), Hutton won both the Academy Award and the Golden Globe for Best Supporting Actor. His performance also earned him the Golden Globe Award for New Star of the Year in a Motion Picture – Male. Immediately following his success, he starred in the acclaimed 1981 ABC television film A Long Way Home co-starring Brenda Vaccaro.

Hutton's next feature film, Taps (with George C. Scott, Sean Penn, and Tom Cruise), was popular with critics and audiences, but during the next several years, his motion pictures, such as Iceman, Daniel, Turk 182, Made in Heaven, and Q&A, struggled at the box office. His only substantial hit was 1985's The Falcon and the Snowman which teamed him again with Sean Penn.

In 1984, he directed the music video for the song "Drive" by The Cars.

In 1989, he made his Broadway stage debut opposite his Ordinary People co-star Elizabeth McGovern in the A.R. Gurney play Love Letters. He followed this with another Broadway role in the Craig Lucas hit comedy, Prelude to a Kiss, which also starred Mary-Louise Parker and Barnard Hughes.

During the late 1980s and into the 1990s, Hutton began to take large supporting parts in films, most notably in Everybody's All-American with Jessica Lange and Dennis Quaid and French Kiss with Meg Ryan and Kevin Kline. In 1996, he starred in the popular ensemble film, Beautiful Girls, playing opposite 14-year-old Natalie Portman in one of her early standout film roles.

Moving on to television, he starred as Nero Wolfe's assistant and leg-man Archie Goodwin in the A&E television series A Nero Wolfe Mystery (2001–2002); he also served as an executive producer, and also directed several episodes of the series. His other directing credits include the family film Digging to China (1997). In 2001 Hutton starred in the television miniseries WW3, and in 2006 he had a lead role in the NBC series Kidnapped, playing Conrad Cain, the wealthy father of a kidnapped teenager. He appeared in 13 feature films from 2006 to 2008.

Hutton starred in the television series Leverage from 2008 to 2012, where he played former insurance investigator Nate Ford who led a group of thieves who acted as modern-day Robin Hoods.

In 2014, Hutton was cast opposite Felicity Huffman in John Ridley's ABC crime drama American Crime.

Other pursuits
Hutton is one of the owners of the New York City restaurant and bar P. J. Clarke's. In 2003 he became president of Players, a New York actors' club, but he resigned in June 2008 due to work keeping him in Los Angeles. He has also made a few forays into directing, the most famous of which includes the music video for the Cars' hit single "Drive" in 1984. In 2010, he directed the music video for "The House Rules" by country rocker/Leverage co-star Christian Kane. He also directed several episodes of A&E's A Nero Wolfe Mystery, in which he also starred.

Hutton starred in a Groupon commercial during the 2011 Super Bowl which drew public ire for the parodying of the Tibetan resistance movement. The commercials were pulled from rotation on February 10 after continued negative response from the public and activist groups.

Personal life

Hutton has been married twice. His first marriage (1986–1990) was to actress Debra Winger; they have a son, Noah, born in 1987.

Hutton dated Demi Moore, Uma Thurman, and Angelina Jolie.

In 2000, he married illustrator Aurore Giscard d'Estaing, niece of former French president Valéry Giscard d'Estaing. Their son Milo was born in Paris in 2001. In July 2009, Us Weekly reported that Hutton and Giscard d'Estaing had separated.

Hutton became a Freemason at Herder Lodge No. 698 in New York City in 2005.

Rape accusation 
In March 2020, Sera Johnston, a former child model and actress, accused Hutton of raping her in 1983, when she was 14. 

Hutton has denied ever meeting Johnston. One of Johnston's friends who was there the night of the alleged incident has signed an affidavit that Hutton and Johnston were there together that night, and she heard noises from the room they left to that sounded like Johnston was in pain and may have been muffled. Between a few days after the alleged rape to over the years following, Johnston told her mother and four friends. After Johnston began her legal complaint, Johnston's former step-father stated he had heard of the incident years before. Réal Andrews said in an interview that he had seen Johnston in Hutton's hotel room, but later denied it in a legal statement.

Johnston filed a criminal complaint against Hutton with the Vancouver Police Department the previous November. Hutton, who was 22 when the alleged incident occurred, "completely and unequivocally" denied the accusations and filed a criminal complaint against Johnston for extortion. In July 2021, Canadian authorities closed their investigation into Johnston's accusations without filing charges.

Filmography

Film

Television series

Television films

Director

See also
 Lists of American actors
 List of oldest and youngest Academy Award winners and nominees – Youngest winners for Best Actor in a Supporting Role
 List of actors with Academy Award nominations

References

External links

1960 births
20th-century American male actors
21st-century American male actors
American male film actors
American male television actors
American music video directors
American television directors
Best Supporting Actor Academy Award winners
Best Supporting Actor Golden Globe (film) winners
Fairfax High School (Los Angeles) alumni
Film directors from Los Angeles
Film directors from Massachusetts
Living people
Male actors from Malibu, California
New Star of the Year (Actor) Golden Globe winners
People from Arlington, Massachusetts